The Mayor of Torbay was the directly elected executive mayor of the borough of Torbay in Devon, England.  The post was abolished in 2019 after a referendum held in May 2016. The last holder of the post was Gordon Oliver.

Referendums

Elections

2005

2011

2015

References

2005 establishments in England
2019 disestablishments in England
Torbay
 Torbay
Torbay